Hebrew Academy For Special Children (HASC) is a Jewish non-profit agency in New York City, United States, providing a wide range of supportive services to children with special needs.  The organization is best known for its summer camps and its annual A Time for Music benefit concert.

History
The HASC (Hebrew Academy For Special Children) Programs were established in 1963 by Rabbi Max and Blanche Kahn to provide educational and clinical services to individuals from infancy through adulthood who exhibit developmental delays. HASC is currently directed by Samuel Kahn.

Services
HASC's services are geared toward infants, children, and adults with speech, learning, or motor limitations and also children who have behavioral difficulties.  There are currently 6 locations in the New York region serving over 1,000 children. In addition HASC provides programs and living quarters like Camp HASC and assisted living apartments throughout the New York city area.

A school is located in Woodmere, New York with a student body of approximately 890 students.

Programs are divided by approximate age ranges:
 Early Intervention (0-3)
 Preschool (3-5)
 School Age (5-21)
 Summer Camp (all ages)

A Time for Music
HASC is well known for its annual A Time for Music benefit concert. These concerts have been held for the last 3 decades in venues such as Lincoln Center, Carnegie Hall and Madison Square Garden.  The concert is viewed as a major event within the New York Jewish community.  In the past it has attracted contemporary Jewish stars like Mordechai Ben David, Avraham Fried, Yaakov Shwekey, Matisyahu, and Ovadya Yaish. A Time for Music is known to have a partnership with Yeshiva Boys Choir, and Eli Gerstner. A Time For Music (being produced by Eli Gerstner since 2016) is taking several members and soloists of Yeshiva Boys Choir on tour around the United States in the Chicago and New Jersey areas, and several more to be announced

Camp HASC
Camp HASC is one of the many organizations founded by Max and Blanche Kahn, in the year 1970. Now Camp HASC is a host to what most consider "Heaven on Earth" with over 300 special needs children. These children are given individual counselors to work, play, and care for them throughout the entire summer.
HASC also provides experience for new nurses just out of nursing school.  For 7 weeks in the summer newly qualified nurses are running the show just as much as the counselors.  A challenging part of their job experience for the new nurses is devising clever ways to encourage the campers to take their medications. The Infirmary provides an aid for those in need, the campers and counselors alike.

In the news
The school found itself in the news in 1998 when it named a building after Senator Alfonse D'Amato and the senator used derogatory terms about some of his political opponents in his acceptance speech.

The agency received a $430,000 federal grant in 2001 to establish a national service center for the disabled.

References

External links
 Camp HASC
 Camp HASC Concert  A Celebration to Benefit the Happiest Place on Earth - Camp HASC
 The HASC website

Medical and health organizations based in New York (state)
Child and adolescent psychiatry
Education in New York City
Jewish educational organizations
Non-profit organizations based in New York City
Special education in the United States
1963 establishments in New York (state)